Donna Marina Torlonia dei Principi di Civitella-Cesi  (22 October 1916 – 15 September 1960) was an Italian-American aristocrat, best known as the paternal grandmother of the actress and model Brooke Shields.

Family

Torlonia was born in Rome, at Palazzo Núñez-Torlonia, the youngest daughter of Marino Torlonia, 4th Prince of Civitella-Cesi and his American wife, Mary Elsie Moore, a daughter of Charles Arthur Moore, a shipping broker and hardware manufacturer from Connecticut. The Torlonia family gained its fortune in the administration of Vatican finances.

She had three siblings:
Donna Olimpia Torlonia dei Principi di Civitella-Chesi (1909–1924)
Don Alessandro Torlonia, 5th Prince of Civitella-Cesi, the husband of Infanta Beatriz of Spain (an aunt of King Juan Carlos I of Spain).
Donna Cristina Torlonia dei Principi di Civitella-Cesi (1913–1974)

About 
In February 1934, Torlonia had made her New York City debut. Torlonia enjoyed going to nightclubs and charity work, and in 1934 she led many charity fundraising efforts. Some of the charity fundraisers she was involved with include the American Auxiliary Hospital in Mougins, France, the Italian Welfare League, New York City Cancer Institute, the New York Diet Kitchen Association, the Babies Hospital of the City of New York, Soldiers and Sailors Club of New York, New York Exchange for Woman's Work, Woman's Auxiliary of the Osteopathic Clinic of New York, Goddard Neighborhood Centre, Children's Village at Dobbs Ferry, New York, among others.

In 1936, Torlonia was dressed as "wealth" with a tall headdress and two hand maids at a one of a nationwide set of birthday celebrations for President Roosevelt. The following year in 1937 at the Roosevelt Birthday Ball Torlonia was one of a hundred women specially dressed to celebrate the event, she was dressed as "The East", representing the Eastern United States fashion, and in attendance was the President's mother Sara Roosevelt.

Sculptor Marino Marini created a wax portrait of Marina Torlonia in 1935.

Marriages
Donna Marina Torlonia dei Principi di Civitella-Cesi was married twice, her husbands being:
Francis Xavier Shields (1909–1975), the American amateur tennis player. They married on 13 June 1940, in North Conway, New Hampshire, and divorced in 1950. The Shieldses had two children: a son, Francis Alexander Shields and a daughter, Marina Shields.
Edward W. Slater, an architect and partner at architectural firm Slater and Chiat, whom she married on 29 December 1950. They had one son, Edward Torlonia Slater (born 1955).
Torlonia was the paternal grandmother of American actress Brooke Shields, the daughter of her son Francis Alexander Shields.

Death
Torlonia died on 15 September 1960, in an automobile accident in Piacenza, Italy, shortly after leaving the wedding of her nephew Marco Torlonia, 6th Prince of Civitella-Cesi, with princess Orsetta Caracciolo, niece of film director Luchino Visconti. Along with Marina, Duke Raffaele Canevaro of Galluzo, and the Countess Eleanor Terry died in the accident.

Ancestry

References

1916 births
1960 deaths
M
Nobility from Rome
Italian people of American descent
Italian princesses
Italian socialites
Road incident deaths in Italy
Italian expatriates in the United States